Laetinaevia is a genus of fungi in the family Dermateaceae. The genus contains 13 species.

Species 

Laetinaevia adonis
Laetinaevia alpina
Laetinaevia blechni
Laetinaevia bresadolae
Laetinaevia carneoflavida
Laetinaevia caulophylli
Laetinaevia colobanthi
Laetinaevia erythrostigma
Laetinaevia fagicola
Laetinaevia lapponica
Laetinaevia longispora
Laetinaevia luzulae
Laetinaevia marina
Laetinaevia minutissima
Laetinaevia minutula
Laetinaevia myriospora
Laetinaevia pustulata
Laetinaevia sedi
Laetinaevia setosa
Laetinaevia stellariae
Laetinaevia triglochinis
Laetinaevia veratri

See also 

 List of Dermateaceae genera

References

External links 

 Laetinaevia at Index Fungorum

Dermateaceae genera
Taxa named by John Axel Nannfeldt